Aïda Sellam (born September 13, 1977) is a Tunisian javelin thrower. Her personal best throw is 60.87 metres, achieved in June 2004 in Tunis.

International competitions

* Representing Africa.

External links

1977 births
Living people
Tunisian female javelin throwers
Olympic athletes of Tunisia
Athletes (track and field) at the 2004 Summer Olympics
African Games gold medalists for Tunisia
African Games medalists in athletics (track and field)
Athletes (track and field) at the 1999 All-Africa Games
Athletes (track and field) at the 2003 All-Africa Games
Athletes (track and field) at the 2001 Mediterranean Games
Athletes (track and field) at the 2005 Mediterranean Games
Mediterranean Games competitors for Tunisia
20th-century Tunisian women
21st-century Tunisian women